Donald E. Freeman (born July 18, 1944) is an American former professional basketball player.  He spent eight seasons (1967–1975) in the American Basketball Association (ABA) and one season (1975–1976) in the National Basketball Association (NBA). Freeman was the youngest of four children.

High school and college career
A 6'3" guard, Freeman attended Madison High School and the University of Illinois. At Illinois, he scored 1449 points and averaged 20.1 points and 10.3 rebounds per game over his three varsity seasons. After finishing his college career as the most prolific scorer in Illinois history, he now ranks 12th all-time in Illinois scoring, and set a record for most points in a season (668), averaging 27.8 in 1965–66. He received first team All Big Ten and first team All-American honors that same season. In 2004, he was named to the University of Illinois' All Century Team.

Playing career
He was selected by the Philadelphia 76ers in the third round of the 1966 NBA Draft.  Freeman never played for the Sixers; rather, he spent the first eight seasons of his career in the ABA, playing for the Minnesota Muskies, Miami Floridians, Texas/Dallas Chaparrals, Utah Stars, Indiana Pacers, and San Antonio Spurs.  He scored 11,544 during his ABA career and appeared in five ABA All-Star Games. His point total ranks 7th all-time in the ABA.  Freeman then joined the NBA's Los Angeles Lakers in 1975. He spent one season with that club, averaging 10.8 points per game before retiring in 1976.

After his career ended, he returned to Champaign, Illinois, where he launched a career in banking. His son, also named Don, was born in 1967, and later attended Rice University on a tennis scholarship. In 1981, he moved to Texas and later to Omaha, Nebraska, where he still resides.

Honors

Basketball
 1965 – 3rd Team All-Big Ten
 1966 – Team Captain
 1966 – Team MVP
 1966 – 1st Team All-Big Ten
 1966 – 1st Team All-American
 1973 – Inducted into the Illinois Basketball Coaches Association's Hall of Fame as a player.
 2004 – Elected to the "Illini Men's Basketball All-Century Team".
 2008 – Honored as one of the 33 honored jerseys which hang in the State Farm Center to show regard for being the most decorated basketball players in the University of Illinois' history.
 2019 – Inducted into the Illinois Athletics Hall of Fame

College

ABA/NBA career statistics

Regular season

Playoffs

All-star game

References

External links
Career stats  @basketball-reference.com
Donnie Freeman @Remember the ABA
@The Scout
@fightingillini.com
@The Telegraph

1944 births
Living people
20th-century African-American sportspeople
21st-century African-American people
African-American basketball players
Amateur Athletic Union men's basketball players
American men's basketball players
Basketball players from Illinois
Dallas Chaparrals players
Illinois Fighting Illini men's basketball players
Indiana Pacers players
Los Angeles Lakers players
Minnesota Muskies players
Miami Floridians players
People from Madison, Illinois
Philadelphia 76ers draft picks
Point guards
San Antonio Spurs players
Shooting guards
Sportspeople from Greater St. Louis
Texas Chaparrals players
Utah Stars players